Valencia County is a county in the U.S. state of New Mexico. As of the 2010 census, the population was 76,569. The county seat is Los Lunas.

Valencia County is included in the Albuquerque, NM Metropolitan Statistical Area.

The county was a significant bellwether region that held the longest record for predicting presidential election winners until 2020.

History
The county, which was formerly much larger in area, lost almost 81 percent of its territory on 19 June 1981, upon the creation of Cibola County, which occupies the westernmost portion of Valencia County's former area.

Geography
It is the second-smallest county in New Mexico by area.

Adjacent counties
 Bernalillo County - north
 Torrance County - east
 Socorro County - south
 Cibola County - west

National protected areas
 Cibola National Forest (part)
 El Camino Real de Tierra Adentro National Historic Trail (part)
 Manzano Wilderness (part)

Other protected areas
 Whitfield Wildlife Conservation Area, est. 2003

Demographics

2000 census
As of the 2000 census, there were 66,152 people, 22,681 households, and 17,350 families living in the county. The racial makeup of the county was 66.5% White, 1.3% Black or African American, 3.3% Native American, 0.4% Asian, 0.1% Pacific Islander, 23.9% from other races, and 4.6% from two or more races. 55.0% of the population were Hispanic or Latino of any race.

There were 22,681 households, out of which 39.6% had children under the age of 18 living with them, 57.2% were married couples living together, 13.1% had a female householder with no husband present, and 23.5% were non-families. 18.8% of all households were made up of individuals, and 6.4% had someone living alone who was 65 years of age or older. The average household size was 2.86 and the average family size was 3.25.

In the county, the population was spread out, with 30.1% under the age of 18, 8.4% from 18 to 24, 29.6% from 25 to 44, 21.7% from 45 to 64, and 10.2% who were 65 years of age or older. The median age was 34 years. For every 100 females there were 100.70 males. For every 100 females age 18 and over, there were 99.10 males.

The median income for a household in the county was $34,099, and the median income for a family was $37,157. Males had a median income of $30,339 versus $23,132 for females. The per capita income for the county was $14,747. About 13.5% of families and 16.8% of the population were below the poverty line, including 22.3% of those under age 18 and 10.8% of those age 65 or over.

2010 census
As of the 2010 census, there were 76,569 people, 27,500 households, and 19,967 families living in the county. The racial makeup of the county was 73.2% white, 3.8% American Indian, 1.4% black or African American, 0.5% Asian, 0.1% Pacific islander, 17.0% from other races, and 4.0% from two or more races. Those of Hispanic or Latino origin made up 58.3% of the population. In terms of ancestry, 10.9% were German, 6.7% were English, 6.1% were Irish, and 4.2% were American.

Of the 27,500 households, 37.1% had children under the age of 18 living with them, 51.8% were married couples living together, 13.9% had a female householder with no husband present, 27.4% were non-families, and 22.1% of all households were made up of individuals. The average household size was 2.73 and the average family size was 3.18. The median age was 37.7 years.

The median income for a household in the county was $42,044 and the median income for a family was $48,767. Males had a median income of $41,511 versus $32,584 for females. The per capita income for the county was $19,955. About 15.7% of families and 19.4% of the population were below the poverty line, including 29.7% of those under age 18 and 12.5% of those age 65 or over.

Communities

Cities
 Belen
 Rio Communities

Town
 Peralta

Villages
 Bosque Farms
 Los Lunas (county seat)

Census-designated places

 Adelino
 Casa Colorada
 Chical
 El Cerro
 El Cerro Mission
 Highland Meadows
 Jarales
 Las Maravillas
 Los Chavez
 Los Trujillos-Gabaldon (former)
 Madrone
 Meadow Lake
 Monterey Park
 Pueblitos
 Rio Communities North (former)
 Sausal
 Tomé
 Valencia

Unincorporated communities
 Bosque
 Tome-Adelino

Education
Valencia County has two school districts: Belén Consolidated Schools and Los Lunas Public Schools.

Notable people
 Bo Diddley lived in Valencia County from 1971 to 1978, while continuing his musical career. He served for two and a half years as a deputy sheriff in the Valencia County Citizens' Patrol; during that time he purchased and donated three highway-patrol pursuit cars. He occasionally played local dances.
 Brian Reynolds Myers, lived in Valencia County during the late 1990s

Politics
Valencia County once held the longest active streak of voting for the winner of U.S. presidential elections, breaking for the nationwide winner in every presidential election from 1952 to 2016. In 2020, both it and Vigo County, Indiana broke their streaks dating back to the 1950s (since 1956 in Vigo) by selecting Donald Trump over eventual winner Joe Biden, leaving Clallam County, Washington, whose streak extends back to 1980, as the holder of longest-running presidential bellwether.  Before 1952, its record is less reliable; the only other Democratic president it voted for was Franklin D. Roosevelt in 1936.

See also
 National Register of Historic Places listings in Valencia County, New Mexico

References
Specific

General
 County status and boundary changes United States Census Bureau

 
1852 establishments in New Mexico Territory
Populated places established in 1852
Albuquerque metropolitan area